Tom Stamsnijder (born 15 May 1985 in Wierden) is a Dutch former professional road bicycle racer, who rode professionally between 2004 and 2018 for the , , ,  and  squads. Stamsnijder is the son of former cyclo-cross world champion Hennie Stamsnijder.

Major results

2002
 1st Tour of Flanders Junioren
 3rd Road race, National Junior Road Championships
2003
 National Junior Road Championships
3rd Road race
3rd Time trial
2004
 3rd Circuit de Wallonie
 6th Omloop van het Waasland
 7th Overall Mainfranken-Tour
1st Prologue & Stage 2
 7th Paris–Roubaix Espoirs
 9th Rund um den Henninger Turm U23
 10th Overall Thüringen Rundfahrt der U23
2005
 1st Stage 3 Tour de la Somme
 1st Prologue Thüringen Rundfahrt der U23
 3rd Time trial, National Under-23 Road Championships
 4th Ronde van Vlaanderen U23
 4th Paris–Roubaix Espoirs
 6th Omloop van het Waasland
 7th Overall Le Triptyque des Monts et Châteaux
 8th Grand Prix de la Ville de Lillers
2006
 1st Stage 4 Grand Prix Guillaume Tell
 1st Stage 1 Settimana Ciclistica Lombarda
 1st Stage 2 Roserittet GP
 2nd Liège–Bastogne–Liège U23
 5th Overall Tour de Normandie
2007
 2nd Sparkassen Giro Bochum
2008
 3rd Overall Danmark Rundt
2009
 7th Hel van het Mergelland
2012
 9th Ronde van Drenthe

Grand Tour general classification results timeline

References

External links 

1985 births
Living people
Dutch male cyclists
People from Wierden
UCI Road World Championships cyclists for the Netherlands
Cyclists from Overijssel
20th-century Dutch people
21st-century Dutch people